Vaisala Oyj is a Finnish company that develops, manufactures and markets products and services for environmental and industrial measurement.

Their major customer groups and markets are national meteorological and hydrological services, aviation authorities, defense forces, road authorities, the weather critical energy sector, life science and high-technology industries and building automation.

Vaisala had over 1,900 employees and net sales of €379.5 million in 2020. Vaisala serves customers in more than 150 countries.

The parent company Vaisala Oyj, domicile in Vantaa, Finland, is listed on the NASDAQ OMX Helsinki. Vaisala Group has offices and operations in Finland, the United States, Australia, Brazil, Canada, China, France, Germany, India, Italy, Japan, Kenya, Malaysia, México, South Korea, Sweden, United Arab Emirates, and the United Kingdom.

History

Vaisala originated in the 1930s when Professor Vilho Väisälä (1889–1969), Vaisala's founder and long-time managing director, invented some of the operating principles of a radiosonde. He sent the first Finnish radiosonde aloft in December 1931. After the first sounding, Väisälä continued with further development and tests until a radiosonde could be brought into production and deliveries started in 1936. From the very start, Vaisala was an international business, exporting 95 percent of the production. As the Vaisala radiosonde became internationally renowned, the demand for them increased. In 1944, Prof. Väisälä established a company called Mittari Oy ("Gauge Incorporated") and set up manufacturing facilities for radiosonde systems.  The first sounding system included a semi-automatic radiosonde receiver, a calibration device and a ground check set. The company employed 13 people at the time. Later, in 1955, the name of Mittari was changed to Vaisala.

From a modest start, the company evolved to become a world leader in many measurement fields and to establish a noteworthy Finnish export industry. At the end of 1954 a modern manufacturing plant was relocated in Vantaa. Since then, the headquarters have been expanded several times and Vaisala's product range has been diversified and expanded greatly. Nowadays Vaisala employs over 1,800 people and serves customers in over 150 countries.

Commercial production since 1936
After the first sounding, Väisälä continued with further development and tests until a radiosonde could be brought into commercial production. Radiosonde deliveries started with the RS11 (1936–). Amongst its first customers was the Massachusetts Institute of Technology. In 1937, Väisälä's radiosonde won a gold medal at the World Fair in Paris.

Recovering from the wars
World War II, the Finnish Winter War 1939–1940 and the Finnish Continuation War 1941–1944, disrupted many lives and upset business and delivery activities internationally. The post-war decades witnessed a strenuous effort to revive the national and international economies. Vaisala grew to employ 60 people in 1954. The first issue of Vaisala News magazine was published in 1959. Thanks to major product development efforts, during the 1950s and 1960s the Vaisala Sounding System became completely electronic, the first automatic radiosonde receiver and the world's first fully transistorized radiosonde RS13 (1965–) were introduced, and the first weather satellite image receiver was delivered. Yrjö Toivola took over as the managing director of the company when Professor Vilho Väisälä died in 1969.

Vigorous 1970s and 80s
The 1970s and 1980s were busy decades for Vaisala. Thin-film technology was developed for Vaisala HUMICAP® relative humidity sensors - the first in the world. The Vaisala CORA Automatic Sounding System - along with automatic weather stations, road weather stations and aviation weather systems  was introduced. In 1975, Vaisala employed over 200 people. During the 1980s, numerous new offices were established to ensure the company's ability to serve customers worldwide  in the UK, Japan, USA, Germany, and Australia. A traffic weather company was also acquired in the UK. Vaisala's first cleanroom was built to enable the design and manufacture of semiconductors in-house. Vaisala BAROCAP® barometric pressure sensor technology was introduced, as well as a new radiosonde family - the Vaisala Radiosonde RS80 (1981–2008). These units made use of a water activated wet battery that had a very long storage life and high power density but a limited working life. The Professor Vilho Väisälä Award was established in cooperation with the WMO, to stimulate interest in meteorological research involving meteorological observation methods and instruments.

The radiosondes have also been used in many upper air ozone research studies using an attached detector that had the sensor data multiplexed with the standard meteorology dataset. GPS positioning information was added to gain more accurate wind speed information.

New millennium
CEO Pekka Ketonen was appointed in 1992. The company was listed on the Helsinki Exchanges in 1994. By then, it employed over 600 people. Further product developments included the introduction of GPS technology for upper air wind measurement, the Vaisala CARBOCAP  sensor, and Vaisala DRYCAP sensor technology for industrial dewpoint measurement. New offices were established in France and China, and business acquisitions in aviation weather and surface weather further enhanced Vaisala's presence in the USA.

The new millennium was kicked off with yet more business acquisitions - in wind profiling, lightning detection and aviation weather. U.S. manufacturing operations were concentrated in Boulder, Colorado. New product launches included a new radiosonde product family - the Vaisala Radiosonde RS92 (2003 - in production), as well as the Vaisala Weather Transmitter, which measures the six most essential weather parameters in one compact instrument.  This was much improved from the previous generation device and now included consumer cells to make up the battery due to energy saving techniques.

CEO Ketonen retired October 1, 2006.  Vaisala's board of directors appointed Kjell Forsén the new company CEO.  Forsén last served as president of Ericsson Finland before joining Vaisala on September 18, 2006.

Vaisala technology has played a part in space exploration for some 60 years, for instance the Mars Rover Curiosity and Schiaparelli EDM lander contain pressure and humidity sensors manufactured by Vaisala.

With new developments in miniaturization, communications and sensors a new radiosonde the model RS41 (2014 - in production) was announced.  This model had again made improvements in specifications. Launch preparation made simple with the RI41 ground check device.  It is smaller and has pre-flight dry-point humidity sensor calibration achieved by heating the sensor to drive off contaminants. It is also available in a model (RS41-SG) without a pressure sensor, the pressure reading is derived from the GPS altitude, temperature and humidity readings.

History of acquisitions and divestments

The Vaisala Group strives for global market and product leadership in selected business areas The goal is achieved mainly by organic growth and supplemented by corporate acquisitions.

1980s
 1987: the Group acquired Tycho Technologies Inc. of USA, manufacturer of upper air windprofiler.
 August 1989: the Group acquired the British Thermal Mapping International Ltd. of United Kingdom. Thermal Mapping specialized in measuring the thermal characteristics of roads and runways and in providing forecast models.

1990s
June 1995: the Group sold Vaisala Technologies Inc. to Breed Technologies Inc. of USA. Vaisala Technologies Inc. (VTI) manufactured silicon capacitive sensors for the car industry.
July 1996: the Group acquired Artais Weather Check Inc. of USA.
March 1999: the Group acquired AIR Inc. of USA.
October 1999: the Group acquired Handar Inc. of USA.

2000s
February 2000: the Group acquired Dimension SA of France.
October 2000: the Group acquired Jenoptik Impulsphysik GmbH of Germany.
June 2001: the Group acquired the Meteorological Systems Unit of Radian International LLC of USA.
March 2002: the Group acquired Global Atmospherics Inc. of Tucson, Arizona, USA.
July 2005: the Group acquired CLH Inc. of Minneapolis, Minnesota, USA.
January 2006: the Group acquired Sigmet Corporation of Westford, Massachusetts, USA.
January 2009: the Group acquired Aviation System Maintenance Inc. (ASMI), Kansas, USA.
December 2009: the Group acquired Quixote Transportation Technologies (QTT), a subsidiary to Quixote Corporation.

2010s
March 2010: the Group acquired Veriteq Instruments Inc of Vancouver, BC, Canada
August 2013: the Group acquired remote sensing manufacturer Second Wind Systems Inc. of Somerville, Massachusetts.
December 2013: the Group acquired 3TIER, Inc., a renewable energy assessment and forecasting services company, headquartered in Seattle, Washington.
October 2017: Vaisala acquired Vionice, a Finnish IT company specialized in computer vision and artificial intelligence.
October 2018: Vaisala acquired all the shares in Leosphere SAS, a French company specializing in developing, manufacturing and servicing turnkey wind lidar instruments for wind energy, aviation, meteorology, and air quality.
December 2018: Vaisala acquired Finnish K-Patents, a pioneer in in-line liquid measurements for industrial applications.
August 2019: Vaisala announced acquisition of Professional Business-to-Business Weather Services from Foreca.

Vaisala business areas
Vaisala's business has been divided into two business areas: Weather and Environment and Industrial Measurements.

Weather and Environment
The Weather and Environment Business Area is divided into five business segments: Meteorology, Ground Transportation, Aviation, Renewable Energy, and Ambient Air
Quality. The customers include meteorological institutes, airports and airlines, road and railroad authorities, renewable energy customers, maritime market segments, as well as defense forces.

Industrial Measurements
Industrial Measurements customers include multiple industries, including pharmaceutical, biotechnical, medical device and drug distribution companies, as well as the power generation and transmission, maritime, automotive, semiconductor, electronics and building automation industries.

Products and services

Measurement Instruments
 Humidity and temperature measurement instruments
 Dewpoint measurement instruments
 Barometric pressure measurement instruments
 Carbon dioxide measurement instruments
 Moisture in oil measurement instruments
 Oxygen measurement instruments
 Wind measurement instruments
 Weather multi-sensor
 Optical weather instruments

Measurement Systems

 Radiosondes and sounding systems
 Dropsondes
 Surface weather systems
 Thunderstorm information systems
 Weather radars
 Windprofilers

Application and Services
 Aviation weather systems
 Traffic weather systems
 Meteorological and hydrological systems

Services and Data Subscription Services
 Customized applications, such as network operation, decision support services and tailored service packages
 Data through Vaisala's own observation network.

Wind Resource & Energy Assessment Services // Remote Sensing Measurement for Wind Industry
 Customized assessment services based on Numerical weather prediction (NWP) such as due diligence assessment, energy production forecasts, consulting offering
 Vaisala's Triton is a SODAR (Sonic Detection And Ranging) device designed for use in wind energy applications

Vaisala Prize
Vaisala established a fund and together with Finnish Academy of Science and Letters, a "Vaisala Prize" is created to recognize distinguished scientists in the active parts of their careers. The first prize was given in 2000, and has been awarded annually since then.

References

External links
"Global Innovator - The story of Vaisala" (70th Anniversary History Book)
Pictures of many radiosondes including a large selection of Vaisala units
The Vaisala product line up in 2004 with a short history of development

Technology companies of Finland
Vantaa
Companies listed on Nasdaq Helsinki
Technology companies established in 1936
Meteorological companies
Finnish brands
1936 establishments in Finland